The 2022 elections for the Illinois Senate occurred on November 8, 2022 to elect Senators from all of the state's 59 Legislative districts in the Illinois Senate. The primary election took place on Tuesday, June 28, 2022. The winners of this election will serve in the 103rd General Assembly with seats apportioned among the state based on the 2020 United States census. Under the Illinois Constitution of 1970, senators are divided into three groups with each group having a two-year term at a different part of the decade between censuses, with the rest of the decade being taken up by two four-year terms. The Democratic Party has held a majority in the Senate since 2003. The inauguration of the 103rd General Assembly occurred on Wednesday, January 11, 2023.

The elections for Illinois United States Senator (Class III), Illinois's 17 congressional districts, Illinois Governor and Lieutenant Governor, Illinois Executive positions, and the Illinois House were also held on this date.

The Republican Party flipped two districts with the Democratic Party flipping one district, resulting in a net gain of one seat towards the Republicans. Despite the seat loss, the Democrats still maintain their supermajority in the Illinois Senate.

Retirements

Democrats
District 1: Antonio Munoz retired.
District 12: Steven Landek retired.
District 16: Jacqueline Y. Collins retired to run for U. S. representative from Illinois's 1st congressional district.
District 23: Diane Pappas retired.
District 31: Melinda Bush retired.
District 43: John Connor resigned.

Republicans
District 45: Brian W. Stewart retired.
District 55: Darren Bailey retired to run for governor of Illinois.

Predictions

Overview

Close races

Election info

Illinois Senate Minority Leader
Bill Brady was the Republican Minority Leader of the Illinois Senate from July 1, 2017 to December 31, 2020. On November 4, 2020, Brady announced he would step down as Senate party leader and would "[hint] at another run for statewide office." Dan McConchie was elected on November 5, 2020 as then-leader-elect of the Republican caucus. Brady would go on to resign from the Senate on December 31, 2020. Alongside the inauguration of the 102nd General Assembly, McConchie was formally confirmed as Republican Minority Leader on January 13, 2021.

Redistricting

District index

Districts 1–29

District 1
The district had been represented by Democratic Assistant Majority Leader Antonio Munoz since January 9, 1999. Munoz was re-elected unopposed in 2020. Initially filing to run, Munoz announced in May 2022 that he would not run for re-election. Javier Cervantes, a business manager for Service Employees International Union, was the Democratic nominee. Cervantes faced no other ballot-listed candidates in the general election.

District 2
The district has been represented by Democrat Omar Aquino since his appointment on July 1, 2016. He was re-elected unopposed in 2018. Aquino faced Wilmer Maldonado and Wilson Vazquez, a Teamster, for the Democratic nomination. Aquino won renomination and faced no other ballot-listed candidates in the general election.

District 3
The district has been represented by Democrat Mattie Hunter since January 8, 2003. Hunter was re-elected unopposed in 2018. She faced no other ballot-listed candidates in the general election.

District 4
The district has been represented by Democratic Majority Leader Kimberly A. Lightford since November 20, 1998. Lightford was re-elected unopposed in 2020. She faced no other ballot-listed candidates in the general election.

District 5
The district has been represented by Democrat Patricia Van Pelt since January 9, 2013. Van Pelt was re-elected unopposed in 2018. She faced no other ballot-listed candidate in the general election.

District 6
The district has been represented by Democrat Sara Feigenholtz since her appointment on January 22, 2020. Feigenholtz was elected unopposed in 2020. Nicole Drewery, a financial examiner, was the Republican nominee.

District 7
The district had been represented by Democrat Heather Steans since her appointment on February 10, 2008. She was re-elected unopposed in 2020. On January 19, 2021, Steans announced that she would be retiring her seat on January 31. Fellow state Representative Kelly Cassidy and CEO of Blue Sky Strategies Mike Simmons were considered the front runners for appointment. While at first the votes were divided, Simmons was chosen by the district's Democratic committeepersons. Simmons was sworn in on February 6, 2021. He faced no other ballot-listed candidates in the general election.

District 8
The district has been represented by Democrat Ram Villivalam since January 5, 2019. Villivalam was first elected unopposed in 2018. He faced no other ballot-listed candidates in the general election.

District 9
The district has been represented by Democrat Laura Fine since January 6, 2019. Fine was first elected with 71.8% of the vote in 2018. Paul T. Kelly was nominated as the Republican nominee.

District 10
The district has been represented by Democrat Robert Martwick since his appointment on June 28, 2019. Martwick was re-elected with 53.8% of the vote in 2020. Martwick faced Erin Jones, a former CPD police officer, for the Democratic nomination. Martwick won renomination and faced no other ballot-listed candidates in the general election.

District 11
The district had been represented by Democrat Celina Villanueva since her appointment on January 7, 2020. She was elected with 79.7% of the vote in 2020. Villanueva was redistricted to the boundaries of the 12th Legislative district and is running for re-election in her new district. Mike Porfirio, a commander in the United States Navy Reserve, is the Democratic nominee. Thomas "Mac" McGill was nominated as the Republican nominee.

District 12
The district had been represented by Democrat Steven Landek since his appointment on February 5, 2011. Landek was re-elected unopposed in 2018. Landek was redistricted to the 11th Legislative district and declined to run for re-election. Celina Villanueva, state Senator of the 11th Legislative district, was redistricted to the 12th district. Villanueva faced Javier Yanez, former chief of staff for Alderman Byron Sigcho-Lopez, for the Democratic nomination. Villanueva won the nomination and faced no other ballot-listed candidates in the general election.

District 13
The district has been represented by Democrat Robert Peters since his appointment on January 6, 2019. Peters was elected unopposed in 2020. He faced no other ballot-listed candidates in the general election.

District 14
The district has been represented by Democratic Deputy Majority Leader Emil Jones III since January 14, 2009. Jones was re-elected unopposed in 2018. He faced no other ballot-listed candidates in the general election.

District 15
The district has been represented by Democrat Napoleon Harris since January 9, 2013. Harris was re-elected unopposed in 2018. He faced no other ballot-listed candidates in the general election.

District 16
The district had been represented by Democratic Assistant Majority Leader Jacqueline Y. Collins since January 8, 2003. Collins was re-elected unopposed in 2020. Collins ran for the Democratic nomination in Illinois's 1st congressional district. Willie Preston, a small business owner, and La'Mont Raymond Williams, an attorney, ran for the Democratic nomination. Preston won the nomination and faced no other ballot-listed candidates in the general election.

District 17
The district has been represented by Elgie Sims since his appointment on January 26, 2018. Sims was elected with 100.0% of the vote in 2018. He faced no other ballot-listed candidates in the general election.

District 18
The district has been represented by Democrat President pro tempore Bill Cunningham since January 9, 2013. Cunningham was re-elected unopposed in 2018. Christine Shanahan McGovern, a business owner, was the Republican nominee.

District 19
The district has been represented by Democrat Michael Hastings since January 9, 2013. Hastings was re-elected unopposed in 2020. Patrick Sheehan, a police officer,  was the Republican nominee.

District 20
The district had been represented by Democrat Iris Martinez January 8, 2003. Martinez was re-elected unopposed in 2018. After being elected Clerk of the Circuit Court of Cook County, Martinez resigned her seat in November 2020. Cristina Pacione-Zayas, former associate vice-president of the Erikson Institute, was appointed on December 22, 2020. Patrycja "PR" Karlin, an attorney, was the Republican nominee.

District 21
The district has been represented by Democrat Laura Ellman since January 9, 2019. She was first elected with 50.6% of the vote in 2018. Kathleen Murray, a small business owner, was the Republican nominee.

District 22
The district has been represented by Democrat Cristina Castro since January 11, 2017. Castro was re-elected unopposed in 2020. She faced no other ballot-listed candidates in the general election.

District 23
The district had been represented by Democrat Tom Cullerton since January 9, 2013. Cullerton was re-elected with 54.9% of the vote in 2018. Cullerton resigned his seat on February 23, 2022 after announcing his intent to plead guilty to federal embezzlement charges. Diane Pappas, former state representative from the 45th district, was appointed to the seat on March 9, 2022. Suzy Glowiak, an engineer and state senator from the 24th district, was the Democratic nominee. Dennis Reboletti, a former state representative, was the Republican nominee.

District 24
The district had been represented by Democrat Suzy Glowiak since January 9, 2019. She was first elected with 50.8% of the vote in 2018. Glowiak was redistricted to the 23rd Legislative district and ran for re-election in her new district. Seth Lewis, state representative from the 45th district, was the Republican nominee. Laurie Nowak, a former member of the DuPage County Board, was the Democratic nominee.

District 25
The district has been represented by Democrat Karina Villa since January 13, 2021. She was first elected with 51.0% of the vote in 2020. Heather Brown, a West Chicago city alderwoman, was the Republican nominee.

District 26
The district has been represented by Republican Minority Leader Dan McConchie since his appointment on April 20, 2016. McConchie was re-elected with 54.7% of the vote in 2018. Maria Peterson, a small business owner, was the Democratic nominee.

District 27
The district has been represented by Democrat Ann Gillespie since January 9, 2019. She was first elected with 52.0% of the vote in 2018. Joshua Alvarado, a video production artist, and Bill Robertson, a former school superintendent, ran for the Republican nomination. Robertson won the nomination.

District 28
The district has been represented by Democratic Deputy Majority Leader Laura Murphy since her appointment on October 5, 2015. She was re-elected unopposed in 2020. Sal Raspanti, the city clerk for Park Ridge, was the Republican nominee.

District 29
The district has been represented by Democrat Julie Morrison since January 9, 2013. Morrison was re-elected with 63.2% of the vote in 2018. Morrison faced no other ballot-listed candidates in the general election.

Districts 30–59

District 30
The district had been represented by Democrat Terry Link since January 8, 1997. He was re-elected with 68.0% of the vote in 2018. Terry Link resigned his seat on September 12, 2020 because of "roughly a month after he was charged with a federal count of income tax evasion." On September 16, 2020, Link "pleaded guilty to a federal count of filing a false tax return." Adriane Johnson, a chamber of commerce president, was appointed on October 12, 2020. Johnson faced no other ballot-listed candidates in the general election.

District 31
The district had been represented by Democrat Melinda Bush since January 9, 2013. Bush was re-elected with 58.5% of the vote in 2020. She is not seeking re-election. Mary Edly-Allen, a former state representative from the 51st district, and Sam Yingling, state representative from the 62nd district, ran for the Democratic nomination. Edly-Allen won the nomination. Adam Solano, a financial advisor, was the Republican nominee.

District 32
The district has been represented by Republican Craig Wilcox since his appointment on October 1, 2018. Wilcox was elected with 54.7% of the vote in 2018. Allena Barbato, an attorney, was the Democratic nominee.

District 33
The district has been represented by Republican Assistant Minority Leader Don DeWitte since his appointment in September 2018. DeWitte was elected with 50.6% of the vote in 2018. He faced no other ballot-listed candidates in the general election.

District 34
The district has been represented by Democrat Steve Stadelman since January 9, 2013. Stadelman was re-elected with 61.7% of the vote in 2020. Juan Reyes, a former police officer, was the Republican nominee.

District 35
The district has been represented by Republican Dave Syverson since January 9, 2013. He previously represented the 34th district from 1993 to January 9, 2013. Syverson was re-elected unopposed in 2018. Sylverson defeated Eli Nicolosi, Winnebago County Republican Central Committee Chairperson, for the Republican nomination. Syverson faced no other ballot-listed candidates in the general election.

District 36
The district had been represented by Republican Neil Anderson since January 8, 2015. Anderson was re-elected with 50.8% of the vote in 2018. After being redistricted, Anderson is running for re-election in the 47th Legislative district. Glen Evans, a minister, and Rock Island Mayor Mike Thoms ran for the Republican nomination. Thoms won the nomination. Michael Halpin, member of the Illinois House of Representatives for the 72nd Representative district, was the Democratic nominee.

District 37
The district has been represented by Republican Win Stoller since January 13, 2021. Stoller was first elected with 99.71% of the vote in 2020. Stoller defeated Brett Nicklaus, a certified financial planner, for the Republican nomination. He faced no other ballot-listed candidates in the general election.

District 38
The district has been represented by Republican Deputy Minority Leader Sue Rezin since December 11, 2010. Rezin was re-elected with 59.4% of the vote in 2018. She faced no other ballot-listed candidates in the general election.

District 39
The district has been represented by Democratic Senate President Don Harmon since January 3, 2003. Harmon was re-elected unopposed in 2018. He faced no other ballot-listed candidates in the general election.

District 40
The district has been represented by Democrat Patrick Joyce since his appointment on November 8, 2019. Joyce was elected with 58.5% of the vote in 2020. Philip Nagel, a former United States Air Force crew chief, and Krystyna Vela, a real estate agent, ran for the Republican nomination. Nagel won the nomination.

District 41
The district has been represented by Republican John Curran since his appointment on July 23, 2017. Curran was elected with 50.8% of the vote in 2018. He faced no other ballot-listed candidates in the general election.

District 42
The district has been represented by Democratic Assistant Majority Leader Linda Holmes since January 10, 2007. Holmes was re-elected unopposed in 2018. Paul J. Santucci, an adjunct professor at North Central College, was the Republican nominee.

District 43
The district had been represented by Democrat John Connor since January 13, 2021. Connor previously represented the 85th Representative district in the Illinois House from 2017 to 2021. Connor was first elected to the district with 64.5% of the vote in 2020. Connor resigned his seat on April 30, 2020, to care for an immediate family member. Eric Mattson, a firefighter, was appointed on May 6, 2022. Rachel Ventura, a member of the Will County board, defeated Mattson for the Democratic nomination. Dianne Harris, a small business owner, and Michelle Lee, a Joliet Junior College board of trustees member, ran for the Republican nomination. Harris won the nomination.

District 44
The district had been represented by Republican Bill Brady since his appointment in May 2002. He was re-elected unopposed in 2018. On December 31, 2020, Brady resigned from the Illinois Senate. Former Logan County Clerk Sally Turner was appointed on January 25, 2021. Turner faced no other ballot-listed candidates in the general election.

District 45
The district had been represented by Republican Brian W. Stewart since December 5, 2018. He previously represented the 89th Representative district in the Illinois House from 2013 to 2018. Stewart was first elected with 62.6% of the vote in 2018. Stewart announced he would not seek re-election on January 14th, 2022. State Representative Andrew Chesney from the 89th Representative district was the Republican nominee. Gerald Podraza, a small business owner, was the Democratic nominee.

District 46
The district has been represented by Democratic Assistant Majority Leader Dave Koehler since December 3, 2006. Koehler was re-elected with 53.9% of the vote in 2020. Desi Anderson, a business owner, was the Republican nominee.

District 47
The district had been represented by Republican Jil Tracy since January 11, 2017. Tracy was re-elected with 99.7% of the vote in 2018. State Senator Neil Anderson from the 36th Legislative district is running against her for the Republican nomination. This is due to him being drawn out of his district from redistricting. Anderson faced no other ballot-listed candidates in the general election.

District 48
The district had been represented by Democrat Andy Manar since January 9, 2013. He was re-elected with 56.8% of the vote in 2018. On January 17, 2021, Manar resigned from the Illinois Senate to work as a senior advisor for J. B. Pritzker's administration. Springfield City Council and Sangamon County Board member Doris Turner was appointed on February 6, 2021. Sandy Hamilton, state representative from the 99th Representative district, was the Republican nominee.

District 49
The district has been represented by Democrat Meg Loughran Cappel since January 13, 2021. Cappel was first elected with 56.2% of the vote in 2020. Stacey Keagle, a nurse, James Lawson, an electrician, and Felicity Joy Solomon, a life coach, all ran for the Republican nomination. Keagle would initially win the nomination but later dropped out of the race on August 26, 2022 due to health issues. With the Republican Party unable to nominate a new candidate, Cappel faced no other ballot-listed candidates in the general election.

District 50
The district had been represented by Republican Assistant Minority Leader Steve McClure since January 9, 2019. McClure was first elected unopposed in 2018. McClure was redistricted to the 54th legislative district and ran for re-election in his new district. State Senator Jil Tracy from the 47th legislative district was redistricted to the 50th and faced no other ballot-listed candidates in the general election.

District 51
The district has been represented by Republican Assistant Minority Leader Chapin Rose since January 9, 2013. Rose was re-elected unopposed in 2018. Rose faced no other ballot-listed candidates in the general election.

District 52
The district has been represented by Democrat Scott M. Bennett since his appointment on January 12, 2015. Bennett was re-elected with 63.4% of the vote in 2020. Bennett faced no other ballot-listed candidates in the general election.

District 53
The district has been represented by Republican Jason Barickman since January 9, 2013. Barickman was re-elected unopposed in 2018. Barickman faced no other ballot-listed candidates in the general election.

District 54
The district had been represented by Republican Assistant Minority Leader Jason Plummer since January 9, 2019. Plummer was first elected with 70.0% of the vote in 2018. Plummer was redistricted to the 55th legislative district and ran for re-election in his new district. State Senator Steve McClure from the 50th legislative district was redistricted to the 54th. McClure defeated Donald Debolt, a certified public accountant, for the Republican nomination. He faced no other ballot-listed candidates in the general election.

District 55
The district had been represented by Republican Darren Bailey since January 13, 2021. Bailey was first elected with 76.7% of the vote in 2020. On February 22, 2021, Bailey announced his intention to run in the 2022 Illinois gubernatorial election and would be nominated as the Republican nominee. State Senator Jason Plummer from the 54th legislative district was redistricted and faced no other ballot-listed candidates in the general election.

District 56
The district had been represented by Democrat Rachelle Crowe since January 9, 2019. Crowe was first elected with 58.4% of the vote in 2018. After being nominated to serve as United States Attorney for the Southern District of Illinois, Crowe resigned from the Senate on June 15, 2022. Kris Tharp, a police officer, was appointed to the district on July 8, 2022. Erica Harriss, a member of the Madison County board, was the Republican nominee.

District 57
The district has been represented by Democrat Christopher Belt since January 9, 2019. Belt was first elected with 59.2% of the vote in 2018. Wavey Lester, a military veteran, was the Republican nominee.

District 58
The district has been represented by Republican Terri Bryant since January 13, 2021. She was first elected unopposed in 2020. She faced no other ballot-listed candidates in the general election.

District 59
The district has been represented by Republican Dale Fowler since January 11, 2017. Fowler was re-elected with 61.1% of the vote in 2018. He faced no other ballot-listed candidates in the general election.

External links
 Find your district/elected officials  (Needs update for redistricting)
 Illinois Online Voter Registration Application 
 Polling Place Lookup

References

Senate
Illinois Senate
Illinois Senate elections